Reģi is a village in Alsunga Parish, Kuldīga Municipality in the Courland region of Latvia.

On 23 February 2007 a huge fire caused 26 fatalities in Reģi Manor, an  institution for mentally disabled near Alsunga, which was later closed and government took a decision to move the institution to Gudenieki. It was the most fatal fire in the modern history of Latvia.

References

Kuldīga Municipality
Towns and villages in Latvia
Aizpute County
Courland